The World of Doubles is a defunct Grand Prix affiliated men's tennis tournament played from 1976 to 1982.  It was held in Woodlands, Texas in the United States from 1976 to 1979 and in Sawgrass, Florida from 1980 to 1982.  It was held on outdoor hard courts until 1981, when it switched to outdoor clay courts.

Results

References
 ATP Results Archive (forbidden link)

Clay court tennis tournaments
Grand Prix tennis circuit
Hard court tennis tournaments in the United States
Defunct tennis tournaments in Florida
Recurring sporting events established in 1976
Recurring sporting events disestablished in 1982
1976 establishments in Texas
1982 disestablishments in Florida
The Woodlands, Texas
St. Johns County, Florida